Yann Queffélec (born 4 September 1949 in Paris) is a French author who won the Prix Goncourt in 1985 for his novel Les Noces barbares, translated into English as The Wedding. He is the former husband of the late pianist Brigitte Engerer and the brother of musician Anne Queffélec. Their father was the writer Henri Queffélec.

Partial bibliography
 Les Noces barbares (1984)
 Osmose (2000)
 The Sea (2003): coauthor with photographer Philip Plisson and Eliane Georges.

References

1949 births
Living people
Writers from Paris
20th-century French novelists
21st-century French novelists
Prix Goncourt winners
Writers from Brittany
French male novelists
20th-century French male writers
21st-century French male writers